Pictures is the third album by British-Georgian jazz and blues singer Katie Melua, and was released on 1 October 2007. It was released in the USA on 5 May 2009 with a different album cover.

Track listing

Variants
The iTunes release includes a bonus track, "Under the Cherry Moon".

The Japanese release also contains extra tracks, "When You Taught Me How to Dance" and "Closest Thing to Crazy (acoustic version)".

In the United States, the Target store release had four extra live tracks:
 "The Closest Thing to Crazy"
 "Nine Million Bicycles"
 "Piece by Piece"
 "Thank You, Stars"

iTunes early release
On 2 September 2007, iTunes began selling Pictures in many of its locations, including the UK and Australian stores in error, a month before its official release date. Initially, it was unclear if it was in error. However, moderators on Melua's forums had deleted any posts relating to the discussion of the release, and the "tell a friend" link on the UK iTunes Store stated the album would be available on 29 September, suggesting that it should not have been available. Melua's official website also made no mention of an early iTunes release.

By 3 September 2007 the album was unavailable in the iTunes Store, with an error message stating the album would be available on 29 September. The album peaked at number 3 in the UK iTunes vocal-genre chart.

Chart performance
In the United Kingdom, the album debuted at number two with 53,878 copies sold in its first week.

Weekly charts

Decade-end charts

Year-end charts

Certifications

References

2007 albums
Katie Melua albums
Albums produced by Mike Batt